Caladenia strigosa is a plant in the orchid family Orchidaceae and is endemic to South Australia. It is a ground orchid with a single leaf and a single greenish-cream flower with fine reddish streaks. It grows in sandy soil in shrubland.

Description
The leaf and the flowering stem are densely covered with erect white hairs. Flowering occurs in September and October.

Taxonomy and naming
Caladenia strigosa was first formally described in 2006 by David Jones who gave it the name Arachnorchis strigosa from a specimen collected near Ruakkan and the description was published in Australian Orchid Research. In 2008 Robert Bates changed the name to Caladenia strigosa and published the change in Journal of the Adelaide Botanic Garden. The specific epithet (strigosa) is a Latin word meaning "full of bristles" referring to the bristly hairs on the leaf and flowering stem.

Distribution and habitat
This spider orchid grows in shrubland in sandy soil in the Coorong National Park.

References

strigosa
Endemic orchids of Australia
Orchids of South Australia
Plants described in 2006
Taxa named by David L. Jones (botanist)
Taxa named by Robert John Bates